General elections for the Central Tibetan Administration (the Tibetan government in exile) were held on 29 July 2001. For the first time, voters elected the Kalon Tripa (Prime Minister), as well as members of Parliament. Previously the Prime Minister had been appointed by the Dalai Lama under the Parliament's ratification. This was part of a series of reforms encouraged by the Dalai Lama for the democratization of the exile Tibetan community. Lobsang Tenzin, the 5th Samdhong Rinpoche won the election with more than 80% of the vote.

Results

Prime Minister
As is traditional in this process, preliminary or sometimes called primary elections were held months before, on 12 May 2001 with the following results:

References

Central Tibetan Administration elections
Tibet
Tibet
Election and referendum articles with incomplete results